James Hickey may refer to:

James Hickey (soldier) (born 1960), colonel in the US Army who earned notoriety during Operation Red Dawn
James Hickey (Irish politician) (c. 1886–1966), Irish Labour party politician, TD and senator
James Aloysius Hickey (1920–2004), Cardinal and Roman Catholic Archbishop of Washington
James Patrick Hickey (born 1973), President of the Orlando fire protection district
James Hickey (Fenian) (c. 1837–1885), Irish Fenian and Land Leaguer
James Hickey (Australian politician) (1878–1932), Australian trade unionist and politician

See also
Jim Hickey (disambiguation)  
James Augustus Hicky (died 1802), Irishman who launched Hicky's Bengal Gazette, the first newspaper in India, in 1780